Invicta Bus Services was a bus and coach operator in Melbourne, Victoria, Australia. It was a Melbourne bus company that operated 16 bus routes under contract to Public Transport Victoria. It was purchased by Grenda Corporation in March 2009. which in turn was acquired by Ventura Bus Lines in January 2012.

History
Croydon Bus Service owned by Bill Wilson commenced in May 1936 between Croydon and North Croydon. In December 1947 Clem Usher purchased the business. The business expanded with the purchase of Ringwood Bus Service in May 1952, A Turner in 1968, Adams Bus Service in January 1979. In February 1972 the business merged with US Bus Lines to form Invicta United Bus Lines, but this arrangement was dissolved in September 1973.

In July 1987 Invicta purchased Morse's Bus Service in Devonport, Tasmania. This was sold in 1990.

Invicta was acquired by the Grenda Corporation in March 2009. The brand was retained, but after Grenda Corporation was purchased by Ventura Bus Lines in January 2012, it was retired.

Fleet
As at April 2014 the fleet consisted of 97 buses. Fleet livery was fawn and orange that was later superseded by a white, yellow and red livery with a prancing horse reminiscent of that on the Invicta flag.

It later adopted the standard white with red and yellow flashes of Grenda Corporation.

References

Bus companies of Victoria (Australia)
Bus transport in Melbourne
Transport companies established in 1936
Transport companies disestablished in 2012
Australian companies established in 1936
Australian companies disestablished in 2012